The thin disk is a structural component of spiral and S0-type galaxies, composed of stars, gas and dust. It is the main non-centre (e.g. galactic bulge) density, of such matter. For comparison, the Sun is  out from the center. The thin disk contributes about 85% of the stars in the Galactic plane and 95% of the total disk stars. It can be set apart from the thick disk of a galaxy since the latter is composed of older population stars created at an earlier stage of the galaxy formation and thus has fewer heavy elements. Stars in the thin disk, on the other hand, are created as a result of gas accretion at the later stages of a galaxy formation and are on average more metal-rich.

The thin disk contains stars with a wide range of ages and may be divided into a series of sub-populations of increasing age. Notwithstanding, it is considered to be considerably younger than the thick disk.

Based upon the emerging science of nucleocosmochronology, the Galactic thin disk of the Milky Way is estimated to have been formed 8.8 ± 1.7 billion years ago. It may have collided with a smaller satellite galaxy, causing the stars in the thin disk to be shaken up and creating the thick disk, while the gas would have settled into the galactic plane and reformed the thin disk.

See also 

 Disc galaxy
 Galaxy formation and evolution
 Galactic corona
 Galactic halo
 Galactic spheroid
 Spiral arm
 Thick disk

External links 
 Astronomers identify thick disc of older stars in nearby Andromeda galaxy
 Populations & Components of the Milky Way

References 

Galaxies